Craig Dirgo is an American author of techno thrillers and adventure novels, as well as non-fiction.  He started off co-authoring with Clive Cussler on his non-fiction work.  He soon moved to his own novels starring his character, John Taft, an agent of a fictitious US spy agency, the National Intelligence Agency.  He co-authored with Cussler the first two "Oregon Files" novels.

After running projects at Cussler's National Underwater and Marine Agency group since 1987, he became a trustee of the organization.

Early life
Dirgo was born to an Air Force Colonel, and spent much of his youth around American and British airfields.  Having become interested in a collection of cars owned by Cussler, he eventually went to work for NUMA.  From  1987 he was Special Projects director on several expeditions, and remains a trustee.

Works

John Taft
 The Einstein Papers (1999)
 Tremor (2006)
 The Tesla Documents (2013)
 The Cristos Parchment (2014)

Oregon Files
(with Clive Cussler)
 Golden Buddha (2003)
 Sacred Stone (2004)

Eli Cutter
 Eli Cutter: Winter (2016)
 Eli Cutter: Spring (2016)

Non-fiction
(with Clive Cussler)
 The Sea Hunters: True Adventures With Famous Shipwrecks (1996)
 Clive Cussler and Dirk Pitt Revealed (1998)
 The Sea Hunters II: Diving the World's Seas for Famous Shipwrecks (2002)

Other fiction
Gunnison Grit (2012)
New South Britain (2013)

References

Year of birth missing (living people)
Living people
20th-century American novelists
Techno-thriller writers
American thriller writers
American spy fiction writers
21st-century American novelists
American adventure novelists
American male novelists
20th-century American male writers
21st-century American male writers